Fårup Summer Park is a theme park located in Fårup between Blokhus and Løkken in North Jutland, Denmark. The park, as the name suggests, is open during the summer months and attracts about 600,000 people each season. It is one of Denmark's biggest amusement parks and has the largest water park of any amusement park in the country. The park currently has seven roller coasters and many other rides as well.

History
Opened on 21 June 1975 by the Kragelund family, which had been in the wholesale business in Aalborg for 90 years when Anders Kragelund decided to sell and start a new business - an amusement park. He chose for the site of this venture North Jutland, a beautiful and popular holiday area in Denmark. The amusement park opened small with only a handful of children´s rides and attracted about 40.000 guests in its first operating season in 1975. Over the years the park has grown in popularity and been expanded in area as well, by 1983 many new rides had been added and about 350.000 people visited the park that year. In 1989 a water park was added (Djurs Sommerland had added a water park in 1985). Since 2001 the park has added 5 new roller coasters to its slate, most recently in 2012 and 2013.

The majority of the rides in this park cater to every member of the family making this a very child-friendly amusement park. The park is nicely landscaped with plenty of trees everywhere and a lake separating the amusement park area from the water park. Even though some of the rides are themed the park itself is not divided into specifically themed areas. The Aqua Park is included in the admission price.

Roller coasters

Water rides
Farup Rafting - river rapids ride that opened in 1998. Designer: Bear Rides.
Træstammerne (The Tree Trunks) - log flume ride that opened in 1991. Designer: Big Country Motioneering.

Other rides

Crazy Golf - mini golf course opened in 2018.
Farup Boats - sail your own boat on the lake.
Farup Railway - a 1930s style railroad.
4D Cinema - shows a 4D film, the theater opened in 2006.
Forest Rush - spinner ride that opened in 2009. Height limit 
Rowing Boats - row your own boat on the lake.
Rævens Hule (The Fox Hole) - fun house that opened in 2010.

Rides for children
Air Trampolines - trampolines, opened in 1994.
Canoes - paddle your own canoe on the lake.
Designer: Zierer.
Excavators - operate your own digger, opened in 1994.
Farup Racing Team - roundabout.
Gold Digging - pan for gold.
Horses - ride the Icelandic horses.
Pedal Boats - pedal your own boat on the lake.
Pedal GoKarts - pedal karts that opened in 2002.
Play Ground  - play area for the kids that opened in 2000.
The Red Baron - airplanes. Designer: Zamperla.
Safari Cars - on track safari cars.
Shooting - test your skill shooting, opened in 2001.
The Spider - challenge course that opened in 2002.
The Spinning Tree - rocking tug that opened in 2009. Designer: Zierer.
Teacups - spinning tea cups. Designer: Zierer.
Traffic School - kids can drive their own car, opened in 1990. Height limit  max.
Trampolines - trampolines.
Treasure Hunt - challenge course that opened in 1996 and expanded in 2010.
Volcano - climbing course that opened in 2002.

Water park

The water park opened in 1989 and is included in the admission price.
Children´s Complex - water play area for kids that opened in 1989.
Surf Hill - body slide that opened in 1989.
Vandslagen - family rafting ride that opened in 2011.
Water Cycline - funnel ride that opened in 2007.
Wave Pool - a  large wave pool that opened in 1993 - is heated to 27 degrees.
Wild River - three different tube rides that opened in 1989.
Water Cannon - free fall and two loops - opened in 2015
Water Fall - a 35 metre water slide that goes in only one direction: Down!

Shows
The park hosts various special events throughout the summer season including motor cycle meet, open air music concerts and more.

Extras
Arcade Games
Test Your Skill Games

External links 

  

Amusement parks in Denmark
Buildings and structures in Jammerbugt Municipality
1975 establishments in Denmark
Amusement parks opened in 1975